Cybistax is a genus of trees in the family Bignoniaceae. It contains a single species, Cybistax antisyphilitica, a tree from tropical North and South America.

Description

These semi-deciduous plants have greyish green, opposite, palmately compounded leaves and close-grained, light-colored wood good for furniture. In early spring, the plants bear showy clusters of bright yellow, funnel-shaped flowers 2–2.5 cm wide at branch ends. Pods are 25–50 cm long, straight, pendulous and brown with thin, flat seeds inside. The seeds have papery wings.

References

Bignoniaceae
Bignoniaceae genera
Monotypic Lamiales genera
Trees of Peru